The IAI EL/W-2090 is an airborne early warning and control (AEW&C) radar system developed by Israel Aerospace Industries (IAI) and Elta Electronics Industries of Israel. Its primary objective is to provide intelligence to maintain air superiority and conduct surveillance. The system is currently in-service with the Indian Air Force.

It is a development of the EL/M-2075 system, described by the Federation of American Scientists as the most advanced AEW&C system in the world in a 1999 article.

Design and features
The EL/W-2090 is a further development of EL/M-2075 and EL/W-2085.

The EL/W-2090 uses the active electronically scanned array (AESA), an active phased array radar. This radar consists of an array transmit/receive (T/R) modules that allow a beam to be electronically steered, making a physically rotating rotodome unnecessary. AESA radars operate on a pseudorandom set of frequencies and also have very short scanning rates, which makes them difficult to detect and jam.

Sales

Sale to India 
In March 2004, as a part of a tri-partite deal among Israel, India, and Russia, Israel and India signed a US$1.1 billion deal according to which IAI would deliver the Indian Air Force three AEW&C radar systems, each of which was worth approximately $350 million. India signed a deal with Ilyushin of Russia for the supply of three Il-76 A-50 heavy airlifters, which were to be used as platforms for these radar systems, for an additional US $500 million. In 2008, media reports suggested that India and Israel were about to sign a deal for three additional radars. India received its first AWACS on 25 May 2009. It landed in Jamnagar AFB in Gujarat completing its 8 hour long journey from Israel.

In November, 2016, India signed another deal to purchase two more AEW&C radar systems. The deal entails a purchase of further 2 systems of the AWACS for $1billion with deliveries scheduled within the next 3 years.

Cancelled Sale to China 
In 1994, Israel entered into talks with China regarding the sale of the Phalcon radar system, initially for four units but with an understanding that as many as eight would be procured. An agreement between China and Israel was signed in July 1996. Russia entered the program in March 1997; the first Il-76 slated for modifications landed in Israel in October 1999. Although the US government was aware of the sale, it remained silent until October 1999, when it publicly opposed the sale of the EL/W-2090 to China. Fearing that the system would alter the military balance in the Taiwan Strait, American officials threatened to withhold aid to Israel in April 2000 if the deal proceeded.
 
On 12 July 2000, Prime Minister Ehud Barak announced that Israel would scrap the deal. However, it was not until July 2000 when a formal letter was sent to the Chinese government; the Israeli government hoped that the newly elected Bush administration would endorse the Phalcon deal. In March 2002, Israel concluded a $350-million compensation package to China, more than the $160-million advance payment China had already made. Subsequently, the original Chinese KJ-2000 AEW&C entered service in 2004.

Operators
 - Three in service & two ordered on an Ilyushin Il-76 platform.

References

External links
 
 

Aircraft radars
Military radars of Israel
Elta products
Military aviation

es:EL/M-2075
ko:EL/M-2075
he:פאלקון (מערכת)
ro:EL/M-2075
ru:IAI Phalcon
tr:EL/M-2075 Phalcon